_9MOTHER9HORSE9EYES9, sometimes abbreviated to 9M9H9E9 or MHE, is the screen name of an anonymous writer of creepypasta speculative fiction on the social news website Reddit.

Work
From 22 April to 17 July 2016, the writer posted a science fiction horror story in short installments to apparently random Reddit discussion threads. The story, sometimes referred to by others as the Interface series, touches on such topics as "Vietnam, Elizabeth Bathory, the Treblinka concentration camp, humpback whales, the Manson Family and LSD", and particularly involves entities called "flesh interfaces".

The story attracted media notice the day after its first parts were published. The Guardian, reporting on the story, described it as "compelling" and "gradually more beautifully and boldly written from multiple narrative perspectives". Vice mentioned the possibility of the whole thing being part of a viral marketing campaign for something yet unknown. An impromptu fandom collects information about the story in a subreddit and wiki.

Plot summary
The story features several loosely-interconnected narratives. Most individual narratives are linear, but the story jumps between them non-linearly.

Early parts of the story focus on two main narratives:

 The first one deals with attempts to create, understand and control interdimensional portals in the form of tunnels lined with human flesh, named "flesh interfaces", created by subjecting people to large doses of LSD. Flesh interfaces are first created in 1944 in Treblinka, and research about them is abandoned around the year 2020.
 The second narrative takes place in 2039, with a large share of humanity spending their entire lives connected to virtual reality Internet feeds. An unknown entity named Q hijacks the Internet to take over the minds of humanity. It is hinted that Q has been empowered by the prior experimentation on flesh interfaces. The last survivor of a group dedicated to fighting Q and her caretaker flee the nuclear bombing of Atlanta and, knowing that all their attempts to stop Q will be futile, starts writing their life stories, trying to create another timeline in which Q is stopped.

The later parts of the story deal with two more narratives:

 In one of them, a young child is abducted by a supernatural entity made of animal body parts, including horse eyes, which names itself Mother.  Mother makes his parents disappear, keeps him locked inside his own house, and forces him to perform magic for it.  His magic doesn't let him escape, but eventually, he uses it to bring his future self to his rescue.
 The second narrative focuses on the experience of addiction through the eyes of Nick, a failed writer struggling with alcoholism and childhood trauma. The novel Nick claims to have written reflects the first parts of the story about flesh interfaces and Q. Eventually, Nick reveals that the abducted child is himself, and the experiences with Mother triggered both his writing and his alcoholism. He doubts his own sanity, but after his roommate narrates his own experience of finding a flesh interface made of bones, he is convinced of the reality of his own experiences and tries to face and understand his past. He visits the flesh interface and unknowingly uses it to travel to the past. In the final scene of the story, the two versions of Nick meet, as the older one makes peace with his past and the younger one is freed from Mother.

It's hinted that Mother and Q are the same entity, and it's not clear if the rescue of Nick is part of a timeline in which Q is defeated.

There are also some small side narratives. One of them culminates with the narrator being assimilated to a flesh interface, one of them seems to document how humans got the ability to create the interfaces and one of them seems to be a metaphor for humans not being able to comprehend flesh interfaces and Q.

Identity
In a later deleted post, the writer described himself as a "30-something American male", and indicated a history of substance abuse. However, this post also incorporated fictional elements of the story. A BBC article also reported that the author said he is "male, in his thirties, lives in the United States, works as a freelance translator, and was once a heavy user of LSD." The author told Gizmodo that "I live in a home for men and work a little to make ends meet." Both Vice and Gizmodo have speculated that Reddit user /u/Anatta-Phi, prolific conspiracy theorist and moderator of the "ShrugLifeSyndicate", a subreddit of similar themes including psychedelics, psychosis and synchronicity, is the writer of the story.

References

External links
Reddit.com: user 9MOTHER9HORSE9EYES9 comments
Reddit.com: "9M9H9E9"
Reddit.com: "ShrugLifeSyndicate"

Year of birth missing (living people)
Living people
American horror writers
American science fiction writers
American science fiction short stories
Reddit people
21st-century American short story writers
Creepypasta
Articles with underscores in the title
21st-century pseudonymous writers